This was the first edition of the tournament.

Diana Shnaider won the title, defeating Nikola Bartůňková in the final, 7–5, 7–5.

Seeds

Draw

Finals

Top half

Bottom half

References

Main Draw

Edge Istanbul - Singles